Reto von Arx (born 13 September 1976) is a Swiss former ice hockey player. He played in the Swiss Nationalliga A from 1995 to 2015. He also played 19 games in the National Hockey League for the Chicago Blackhawks during the 2000–01 season. Internationally he played for the Swiss national team at multiple tournaments, including several World Championships and the 2002 Winter Olympics. He is currently the head coach of EHC Chur.

Playing career
A product of SC Langnau, von Arx played in Switzerland's second division before signing with HC Davos of the top-flight National League A (NLA) in 1995.

Von Arx was drafted 271st overall in the 2000 NHL Entry Draft by the Chicago Blackhawks. He only played the 2000–01 season in the U.S. with the Blackhawks and affiliate the Norfolk Admirals before returning to Switzerland.

Von Arx retired from professional hockey after the 2014-15 NLA season. He played all his 1004 NLA games with HC Davos and won six Swiss championships with the club as well as two Spengler Cup titles (2006, 2011). He was named Most Valuable Player of the National League A three times (2001–02, 2005–06, 2008–09).

Internationally, he competed for Switzerland in the 2002 Olympic Games in Salt Lake City and at four World Championships.

Coaching career 
Before the 2015–16 season, he was named assistant coach for the Swiss national team along Felix Hollenstein and with former NHL player, Patrick Fischer as head coach. Von Arx remained in that job until July 2016 and then joined the coaching staff of the Swiss under-17 national team.

Career statistics

Regular season and playoffs

International

References

External links
 

1976 births
Living people
Chicago Blackhawks draft picks
Chicago Blackhawks players
HC Davos players
Ice hockey players at the 2002 Winter Olympics
Norfolk Admirals players
Olympic ice hockey players of Switzerland
SCL Tigers players
Swiss ice hockey centres
People from Biel/Bienne
Sportspeople from the canton of Bern